"This Is the Kingdom" is a song performed by American contemporary worship band Elevation Worship featuring Pat Barrett, which was released as a promotional single from their tenth live album, Lion (2022), on February 18, 2022. The song was written by Chris Brown, Jason Ingram, Pat Barrett, and Steven Furtick.

"This Is the Kingdom" peaked at No. 27 on the US Hot Christian Songs chart despite not being an official single.

Background
On February 18, 2022, Elevation Worship released "This Is the Kingdom" featuring Pat Barrett as the third promotional single in the lead-up to the release of its parent album, Lion (2022), following the releases of "Same God" and "What I See." The song is based on the Beatitudes in Matthew 5, and is split into two tracks, the second track being a spontaneous flow of worship, the tracks combined running for over fourteen minutes long.

Composition

Commercial performance
"This Is the Kingdom" debuted at number 44 on the US Hot Christian Songs chart dated March 5, 2022.

Music videos
Elevation Worship released the music video for "This Is the Kingdom" featuring Pat Barrett leading the song during an Elevation Church worship service, via YouTube on February 18, 2022. The official lyric video for the song was issued by Elevation Worship through YouTube on March 4, 2022.

Track listing

Charts

Release history

References

External links
 

2022 songs
Elevation Worship songs
Songs written by Steven Furtick
Songs written by Jason Ingram